is a Japanese professional tennis player. Her career-high WTA singles ranking is 105, which she reached in February 2011. Her career-high doubles ranking is 101, achieved May 2015.

Early life and amateur career
Namigata was born in Koshigaya, Saitama Prefecture and started playing tennis when she was six years old. She completed elementary school at a school in Koshigaya and won a regional tournament when in the third grade. She attended Fujimura Girls' Junior High School and Horikoshi High School in Tokyo. In September 1997, when still in junior high school, she made her first appearance in an ITF doubles tournament. In her first year of high school, she reached the round of 16 at the All Japan Tennis Championship and won the All Japan Junior Championship title in her final year of high school. She enrolled in the School of Social Sciences at Waseda University and in 2001 won the intercollegiate doubles title, was runner-up in the singles title, and was a member of the Waseda team that took out the team event. In 2004, she won the intercollegiate singles title and also won her first ITF doubles titles in October.

Professional career
Namigata turned professional in August 2005, after graduating from Waseda in April of the same year. Her goal was to finish her first year as a professional ranked in the top 200; she finished 2006 ranked 162 in singles. The first of her six singles titles came in July 2007.

In July 2014, Namigata won her first WTA event, the doubles tournament of the inaugural Jiangxi International Open, partnering with Chuang Chia-jung. 2014 was the most successful year of her career thus far, winning three ITF doubles titles and her first singles title since 2010. She finished the year ranked 196 in singles and 145 in doubles, returning to the top 200 in each category for the first time since 2011.

Grand Slam appearances
In singles, Namigata has qualified for two Grand Slam tournaments so far. At the 2011 Australian Open, she lost to Canadian Rebecca Marino in the first round. Later in the same year, she lost in the first round of the French Open to Aleksandra Wozniak.

In doubles, she qualified for the 2008 Wimbledon tournament with fellow Japanese player Ayumi Morita, losing in the first round to Ekaterina Makarova and Selima Sfar. In January 2017, Namigata and Chan Chin-wei received wildcard entry into the Australian Open, losing in the first round to Tatjana Maria and Pauline Parmentier.

Fed Cup
Namigata represented Japan in the Asia/Oceania group of the 2011 Fed Cup.

WTA career finals

Doubles: 1 (runner–up)

WTA Challenger finals

Doubles: 1 (title)

ITF Circuit finals

Singles: 23 (7 titles, 16 runner–ups)

Doubles: 51 (25 titles, 26 runner–ups)

Notes

References

External links
 
 
 

1982 births
Living people
Horikoshi High School alumni
Waseda University alumni
Japanese female tennis players
People from Koshigaya, Saitama
Sportspeople from Saitama Prefecture
Universiade medalists in tennis
Universiade bronze medalists for Japan
Medalists at the 2005 Summer Universiade
21st-century Japanese women